The Moscow-Pullman Daily News is a daily newspaper in the northwestern  United States, serving the Moscow, Idaho, and Pullman, Washington, metropolitan area. The two cities on the Palouse are the homes of the two states' land grant universities, the University of Idaho and Washington State University.

History
The newspaper has been published continuously in Moscow for  years, since September 28, 1911. It began as the Daily Star-Mirror, which started as the Moscow Mirror in 1882 and the North Idaho Star in 1887, with a merger in 1905. A final intracity competitor was gained with the arrival of Frank B. Robinson's Moscow News Review, which began in 1933 and went to daily publication in September 1935. The two papers merged in November 1939 and ran briefly under a lengthy combined name, then became the Daily Idahonian.

The Palouse Empire News for Whitman County was added in 1984 and later became the Daily News. Later in the 1980s, the paper was acquired by Kerns-Tribune of Salt Lake City, Utah. The Idahonian and the Daily News were merged in late 1991, and became the Moscow-Pullman Daily News. Kerns-Tribune was acquired by TCI in 1997; all the company's papers,  except The Salt Lake Tribune, were acquired by Butch Alford the next year.

For decades, the newspaper's facilities were at 409 South Jackson Street. After printing operations moved south to Lewiston, it downsized its headquarters in Moscow in 2013 and moved three blocks east, to the federal building.

Notable employees
The first editor of the Moscow Mirror was Willis Sweet (1856–1925), Idaho's first elected congressman following statehood in 1890. He had come to Moscow after learning the printer's trade in Nebraska; he was later an attorney, judge, and territorial supreme court justice. Sweet was instrumental in obtaining the University of Idaho for Moscow and was the first president of its board of regents (1889–1893).

Tom McCall (1913–1983), governor of Oregon (1967–1975), was a young reporter in Moscow for five years (1937–1942) for the News-Review and the Daily Idahonian.

References

External links

Moscow-Pullman Daily News - Google News archive 1986–2009
University of Idaho Library - Moscow and Latah County newspapers

Newspapers published in Idaho
Mass media in Moscow, Idaho
Moscow, Idaho
Latah County, Idaho
Whitman County, Washington
Pullman, Washington
Daily newspapers published in the United States